CKE Restaurants Holdings (an acronym from Carl Karcher Enterprises) is an American fast food corporation and is the parent organization for the Carl's Jr., Hardee's, Green Burrito, and Red Burrito brands. CKE Restaurants is a subsidiary of the private equity firm, Roark Capital Group, and is headquartered in Franklin, Tennessee.

In October 2020, CKE Restaurants operated or franchised to locations in 44 US states and 43 foreign countries and US territories.

History

1940s 

In 1941 Carl's Jr. founder, Carl Karcher, entered the fast food market by purchasing a hot dog cart in Los Angeles.

1950s 

In 1956, Karcher opened the first Carl's Jr. restaurants in Anaheim and Brea, California.

1990s 

In 1996, CKE acquired Rally's and Taco Bueno. Rally's was later sold to Checkers in 1999. Checkers and Rally's then followed a similar regionalization concept as CKE has for its Carl's Jr. and Hardee's chains. Taco Bueno was sold in 2001 when private investment group Jacobson Partners purchased the chain for US$72.5 million dollars to help aid CKE Restaurants in a debt battle.

In 1997, CKE acquired Hardee's from Canadian-based company Imasco.

2000s 

In September 2000, Andrew Puzder was named CEO. Prior to becoming the CEO, Puzder had been the personal attorney to the founder Karcher since 1986.

In March 2002, CKE purchased Santa Barbara Restaurant Group (SBRG) and acquired direct ownership of the Green Burrito brand as part of the sale.

2010s 

On February 26, 2010, THL Partners agreed to acquire CKE Restaurants.  However, CKE Restaurants was, instead, acquired by Columbia Lake Acquisition Holdings, an affiliate of Apollo Management VII in July 2010, after CKE accepted a $693.9 million takeover offer from Apollo Global Management, ending the earlier takeover agreement with THL Partners.

On November 20, 2013, Roark Capital Group agreed to acquire CKE from Apollo Global Management for $1.65–$1.75 billion.

On March 4, 2016, CKE Restaurants Holdings announced that they would be consolidating their corporate offices in St. Louis, Missouri, and Carpinteria, California, and moving them to Franklin, Tennessee. CKE's Anaheim, California, office remained open until it was consolidated with the Franklin headquarters in 2018, with most of the Anaheim office's jobs outsourced to India and the Philippines.

In December 2016 Andrew Puzder was nominated by President Donald Trump as US Secretary of Labor and resigned from CKE Restaurants as CEO in March 2017. Puzder ultimately withdrew from the nomination after his own admission of hiring an undocumented immigrant, failing to pay taxes and controversy from his companies' labor violations became public during the confirmation process.

On March 21, 2017, CKE announced the selection of Jason Marker as CEO for the company, succeeding Andrew Puzder. Marker, a New Zealand native, had previously served as the president of Kentucky Fried Chicken US, a subsidiary of Yum! Brands which is a direct competitor to CKE Restaurants. In June 2018, Marker was the subject of an age discrimination suit by a 58-year-old CKE marketing employee who was terminated in 2017 after 16 years of employment and had relocated with the company to Tennessee. The suit alleged Marker "began to publicly and privately display his shock and disgust with the fact that the CKE executive and management team consisted primarily of employees over the age of 50.", with Marker reportedly saying it was "depressing" and "something had to be done" about it. The suit also listed four top officials in the company over 50 who had been replaced by younger employees.

On April 12, 2019, Ned Lyerly was named CEO and appointed to CKE's board of directors. Lyerly had worked with CKE for over 30 years at the time of his appointment and was previously the president of CKE's international operations.

Fundraising 

CKE conducts an annual Stars for Heroes in-store fundraising campaign by soliciting donations from customers at both Hardee's and Carl's Jr. restaurants to benefit US military veterans and their families. Since the program's launch in 2011, Stars for Heroes raised nearly US$5 million by 2015.

International 
, there were over 3,800 franchised or company-operated restaurants in 44 US states and 43 foreign countries and US territories.

Criticisms and controversies

Hypersexualized ads 
The 2005 launch of a commercial of Paris Hilton sensually washing a Bentley in a bikini, marked the start of Carl's Jr. and Hardee's supermodel-centric marketing strategy. Since then Carl's Jr. ads have featured a number of female celebrities including Heidi Klum, Kim Kardashian, Kate Upton, Katherine Webb as well as other attractive models.
A study found that 52 percent of viewers surveyed found a Carl's Jr. commercial starring bombshell Charlotte McKinney offensive. Carl’s Jr. is led by parent company CKE Restaurants Holdings, and from 2000 to 2017, CKE was run by Andrew F. Pudzer, who was a very vocal advocate of the racy ads.

By the end of 2019, the company decided to change their advertising direction after partnering up with 72andSunny advertising agency. “Our plan moving forward is really about how to keep food at the center of what we’re doing,” said Chad Crawford, CKE’s chief brands officer.

Animal Welfare Policies 
In September 2007, after more than a year of discussions with PETA, CKE Restaurants (the parent company of Hardee’s and Carl’s Jr.) announced a new animal welfare program that would phase in cage-free eggs, and began sourcing pork from suppliers that did not use gestation crates for pregnant pigs. The plan also gave consideration to poultry suppliers that were willing to use controlled-atmosphere killing, which was the most humane form of slaughter available.

In July 2016 CKE Restaurants announced that it would work to ensure that its pork supply is purchased from suppliers who use group housing methods for pigs.

In December 2018 the chain became the first fast-food restaurant to serve Beyond Meat for breakfast, lunch, and dinner.

In the 2021 World Animal Protection released the second Quit Stalling report where it was stated that CKE Restaurants’ current commitment language refers only to group housing and does not specify full elimination of gestation crates. No progress update was provided.

The Humane Society has stated in its Scorecard that while CKE has many animal welfare policies, for the most part, they fall short of meaningfully addressing the most pressing concerns.

For example, the company’s policy around pork procurement falls short of a commitment to eliminate gestation crates; instead, it focuses on a transition to group housing for sows (which is an important difference, as even many group housing systems still use gestation crates). And even though this commitment is weak, the company has reported neither progress made nor steps taken toward implementing it.

CKE’s most meaningful policy is a promise to switch to 100% cage-free eggs by 2025. However, the company discloses neither progress made nor steps taken toward keeping that promise.

One area where CKE is doing well is with regard to plant-based proteins, having added, tested and nationally promoted several options.

Cage-free Egg Commitment 
One of the ongoing criticisms surrounding CKE is their animal welfare policy, especially concerning eggs. In 2017 CKE committed to transitioning their egg supply to 100% cage-free eggs in all U.S. restaurants by 2025. However, at the moment there is no documentation of their cage-free promise. It seems that CKE has altogether abandoned their 2016 commitment to go cage-free.

Due to CKE’s failure to publish a public cage-free commitment, many nonprofit, charitable organizations have been publicly critical of CKE Restaurants. Amongst the criticism is a current campaign by animal rights and consumer interest group Equitas, which strives to inform CKE Restaurants’ customers of the company’s caged-egg use through a website and other social media actions.

References

Further reading
 Diners Walk Through One Door and Visit Two Restaurants—Article in The New York Times on the strategy of multi-branding restaurants

External links
 CKE Restaurants corporate website

 
Restaurant groups in the United States
Restaurants established in 1956
Companies based in Franklin, Tennessee
1956 establishments in California
2010 mergers and acquisitions
2013 mergers and acquisitions
Private equity portfolio companies
Companies formerly listed on the New York Stock Exchange